Steven James Rigg (born 30 June 1992) is an English footballer who last played as a striker for Workington. Rigg has previously played for Keswick, Penrith, Barrow , Queen of the South and Carlisle United in two spells with the club.

Career
Rigg began his senior career with Northern League club Penrith. Rigg had previously represented Keswick at youth level. Whilst at Penrith, Rigg was employed as a forester at the National Trust.

In July 2014, Rigg signed for League Two club Carlisle United on a one-year professional contract. Rigg signed after a two-week trial period. He debuted in the Football League on 4 October 2014 and also scored in a 3–0 win over Hartlepool United. On 13 November 2014, Rigg signed a new one-year deal keeping him at the club until the summer of 2016.

On 26 November 2015, Rigg signed for National League Premier club Barrow until January 2016. Rigg was stretchered off on his debut for Barrow, after coming on as a substitute. Rigg suffered ligament damage which was detected after his injured ankle was x-rayed at Kendal Hospital and his loan spell was subsequently cut short.

Rigg was released by Carlisle and signed for Dumfries club Queen of the South of the Scottish Championship when his contract expired at the end of June 2016. Rigg's contract at Queens wasn't renewed during May 2017, so he released after one season.

On 12 October 2017, Rigg rejoined the Cumbrians on a short-term contract after being given training facilities with the Brunton Park club to regain his fitness after suffering from a long-term injury whilst playing for the Doonhamers.

In June 2019 he moved from Gateshead to Dover Athletic. Following's Dover's decision to not play any more matches in the 2020–21 season, made in late January, and subsequent null and voiding of all results, on 5 May 2021 it was announced that Rigg was out of contract and had left the club. On 4 July 2021, he signed for Northern Premier League Division One West side Workington, rejoining the club where he had a loan spell in 2014.

Career statistics

References

External links

1992 births
Living people
People from Keswick, Cumbria
English footballers
Association football midfielders
Association football forwards
Penrith F.C. players
Carlisle United F.C. players
Barrow A.F.C. players
Queen of the South F.C. players
Chorley F.C. players
Workington A.F.C. players
Gateshead F.C. players
Dover Athletic F.C. players
Northern Football League players
English Football League players
National League (English football) players
Scottish Professional Football League players
Northern Premier League players
Footballers from Cumbria